Héctor Junior Firpo Adames (born 22 August 1996), known as Junior Firpo or simply Junior, is a professional footballer who plays as a defender for Premier League club Leeds United. Mainly a left-back, he can also play as a centre-back or right-back.

Club career

Real Betis
Firpo was born in Santo Domingo, Dominican Republic and moved to Benalmádena, Málaga, Andalusia at the age of six and joined Real Betis' youth setup in June 2014, aged 18, from Puerto Malagueño. He made his senior debut with the reserves on 15 February 2015, starting in a 1–1 home draw against Granada B in the Segunda División B.

Definitely promoted to the B-side ahead of the 2015–16 season, Junior appeared regularly during the season, which ended in relegation. On 17 April 2016 he scored his first senior goal, netting the third in a 4–0 away win over Algeciras..

On 1 August 2017, after spending the whole pre-season with the main squad, Junior renewed his contract until 2021. He made his first team – and La Liga – debut the following 12 February, starting in a 1–0 away defeat of Deportivo La Coruña, becoming the first Dominican Republic-born player to have ever featured in La Liga.

Junior scored his first professional goal on 17 March 2018, netting the first in a 3–0 home win against Espanyol. On 19 August, after being promoted to the main squad, he agreed to a contract extension until 2023.

Barcelona
On 4 August 2019, Junior signed a five-year deal with Barcelona for €18 million 
plus €12 million in add-ons. He made his debut three weeks later in a 5–2 home win over his former club Betis, playing the last nine minutes in place of Rafinha. On 28 September, Junior scored his first goal for Barcelona and the second goal against Getafe in 2–0 win. On 27 November, he made his UEFA Champions League debut in a 3–1 group stage victory over Borussia Dortmund.

On 13 February 2021, Firpo scored his second (and last) goal for Barça in a  5–1 home win over Alavés.

Leeds United
On 6 July 2021, Firpo signed a four-year deal with Premier League club Leeds United for a fee of €15 million plus add-ons, with Barcelona reserving rights to 20% of his future sales. He was expected to replace Ezgjan Alioski at the left back role after Alioski's contract expired, and made his debut for the club in that position on 14 August in the second half of the season opener at Old Trafford, where he came on as a tactical substitute for Rodrigo in a 5–1 loss.

He scored his first goal for the club in Leeds’ 3-1 win in the FA Cup fourth round at the Wham Stadium over Accrington Stanley on 28 January 2023. On 25 February 2023, Firpo scored his first Premier League goal, and the first goal of new manager Javi Gracia’s reign in a 1-0 win against Southampton at Elland Road.

International career
Despite being born in the Dominican Republic, he has spent the majority of his life in Spain and continues to hold citizenship for both countries. On 9 October 2015, he played the entire second half of a 0–6 non-FIFA friendly loss for the Dominican Republic senior national team against the Brazil Olympic team.

On 31 August 2018, Junior was called up to the Spain under-21 team for two 2019 UEFA European Under-21 Championship qualifying matches against Albania and Northern Ireland. He made his debut on 7 September, starting in a 3–0 win against the former.

Career statistics

Honours
Barcelona
Copa del Rey: 2020–21

Spain U21
UEFA European Under-21 Championship: 2019

References

External links
Profile at the Leeds United F.C. website

Beticopedia profile 

1996 births
Living people
Sportspeople from Santo Domingo
Dominican Republic emigrants to Spain
Naturalised citizens of Spain
Dominican Republic footballers
Spanish footballers
Association football fullbacks
La Liga players
Segunda División B players
Tercera División players
Premier League players
Betis Deportivo Balompié footballers
Real Betis players
FC Barcelona players
Leeds United F.C. players
Spain under-21 international footballers
Dominican Republic international footballers
Footballers from Andalusia
People from Torremolinos
Sportspeople from the Province of Málaga
Spanish expatriates in England
Dominican Republic expatriates in England
Spanish expatriate footballers
Expatriate footballers in England